Charles Wesley Davis (January 5, 1827 in Castleton, Vermont – June 8, 1912) was a member of the Wisconsin State Senate. He moved to Oshkosh, Wisconsin in 1860, where he became a lumberman and manufacturer.

Career
Davis was elected to the Senate in 1894. Additionally, he was Mayor of Oshkosh and Chairman of the Winnebago County, Wisconsin Board. He was a Republican. He served as president of the New German American bank in Oshkosh from 1892 to January 11, 1907, when he resigned, stating that man eighty years of age out to resign.

Davis died in his home in Oshkosh from heart disease at the age of 85.

References

People from Castleton, Vermont
Politicians from Oshkosh, Wisconsin
County supervisors in Wisconsin
Republican Party Wisconsin state senators
Mayors of places in Wisconsin
1827 births
1912 deaths